The University of Alabama Crimson Tide football team has had 391 players drafted into the National Football League (NFL) since the league began holding drafts in 1936. This includes 76 players taken in the first round and two overall number one picks, Harry Gilmer in the 1948 NFL draft and Joe Namath in the 1965 AFL draft. Alabama has had 50 former players selected to a Pro Bowl, 140 total Pro Bowl selections over all, 37 have won a Super Bowl with their respective teams and eight have been elected to the Pro Football Hall of Fame.

Each NFL franchise seeks to add new players through the annual NFL draft. The draft rules were last updated in 2009. The team with the worst record the previous year picks first, the next-worst team second, and so on. Teams that did not make the playoffs are ordered by their regular-season record with any remaining ties broken by strength of schedule. Playoff participants are sequenced after non-playoff teams, based on their round of elimination (wild card, division, conference, and Super Bowl). Prior to the merger agreements in 1966, the American Football League (AFL) operated in direct competition with the NFL and held a separate draft. This led to a bidding war over top prospects between the two leagues. As part of the merger agreement on June 8, 1966, the two leagues held a multiple-round "common draft". Once the AFL officially merged with the NFL in 1970, the common draft became the NFL draft.

Selections

Key

National Football League

American Football League

Notes

Notable undrafted players
Note: No drafts held before 1936

References 
General

 
 
 

Specific

Alabama

Alabama Crimson Tide NFL draft